The Tamil prasaśti of Virarajendra Chola records a naval invasion of Kadaram (modern Kedah in Malaysia) by the Cholas in 1068. Sources assert that the expedition was undertaken to help a Kadaram prince who had approached Virarajendra Chola for assistance in procuring the throne. The kingdom of Kadaram is believed to be the same as the Srivijaya empire.

Bibliography 

 

1068 in Asia
Military campaigns involving the Chola Empire
Naval history of India
11th century in India
Naval battles involving Cholas